Nocrich is a commune in Sibiu County, Romania, in the region of Transylvania. The commune is situated between Agnita and Sibiu. It is composed of five villages: Fofeldea, Ghijasa de Jos, Hosman, Nocrich and Țichindeal. Nocrich and Hosman have fortified churches.

It is the site of the St. Ladislaus Baroque church (with many surviving Romanesque elements, dating from previous buildings).

History
In 1910, the Agnita to Sibiu railway line was completed with stations at Nocrich, Țichindeal and Hosman. However, the line was closed in 2001. An active restoration group has since been formed aiming to restore the entire line to working condition.

People
Teodor Aaron
Samuel von Brukenthal
August Treboniu Laurian

References

External links
Nocrich at the Sibiu County website
Pictures of the Nocrich church

Communes in Sibiu County
Localities in Transylvania